The 1983 NCAA Division I Cross Country Championships were the 45th annual NCAA Men's Division I Cross Country Championship and the 3rd annual NCAA Women's Division I Cross Country Championship to determine the team and individual national champions of NCAA Division I men's and women's collegiate cross country running in the United States. In all, four different titles were contested: men's and women's individual and team championships.

Held on November 21, 1983, the combined meet was hosted by Lehigh University at the Saucon Valley Fields in Bethlehem, Pennsylvania. The distance for the men's race was 10 kilometers (6.21 miles) while the distance for the women's race was 5 kilometers (3.11 miles).

The men's team national championship was won by UTEP, but the Miners' performance was later vacated by the NCAA. The individual championship was won by Zakarie Barie, also from UTEP, with a time of 29:20.0.

The women's team national championship was won by Oregon, their first. The individual championship was won by Betty Jo Springs, from NC State, with a time of 16:30.7. This was Springs' second championship after winning the inaugural race in 1981.

Qualification
All Division I cross country teams were eligible to qualify for the meet through their placement at various regional qualifying meets. In total, 22 teams and 182 runners contested the men's championship while 16 teams and 133 runners contested the women's title.

Men's title
Distance: 10,000 meters (6.21 miles)

Men's Team Result (Top 10)

Men's Individual Result (Top 10)

Note: UTEP's team title was later revoked by the NCAA for rules infractions.

Women's title
Distance: 5,000 meters (3.11 miles)

Women's Team Result (Top 10)

Women's Individual Result (Top 10)

See also
NCAA Men's Division II Cross Country Championship 
NCAA Women's Division II Cross Country Championship
NCAA Men's Division III Cross Country Championship
NCAA Women's Division III Cross Country Championship

References

NCAA Cross Country Championships
NCAA Division I Cross Country Championships
NCAA Division I Cross Country Championships
NCAA Division I Cross Country Championships
Sports in Bethlehem, Pennsylvania
Track and field in Pennsylvania
Lehigh University